Dorise Winifred Nielsen (30 July 1902 – 9 December 1980) was a Canadian communist politician, feminist and teacher.

Biography

Before politics
Born in London, England, Doris Webber arrived in Canada and settled in Saskatchewan in 1927 to work as a teacher and married Peter Nielsen, a homesteader, the same year. Adding an 'e' to her given name on her marriage certificate, she became Dorise Nielsen.

Political career
She joined the Co-operative Commonwealth Federation (CCF) in 1934 and was a CCF campaign manager during the 1938 provincial election. By 1937, she joined the Communist Party of Canada but did not disclose her membership until 1943 remaining a member of the CCF until her riding association was dissolved because of its support of a popular front campaign with the Communists.

She was the first member of the Communist Party of Canada to be elected to the House of Commons of Canada,  serving during World War II. She was the third woman elected to Canadian Parliament and the first to still be raising young children while holding political office. She won a seat in the 1940 federal election representing the Saskatchewan riding of North Battleford on the "United Progressives" label, beating the Liberal candidate in a two-way race. Canada banned the Communist Party in June 1940 due to the party's opposition to the war. Nielsen, through indirect contact with Montreal-based Communist leaders who had escaped imprisonment, became a spokeswoman for the Communist Party through speeches made in the House of Commons.

When the Labor-Progressive Party was officially formed in 1943 as a legal front for the still banned Communist Party, Nielsen declared her affiliation with the party and was elected to its national executive committee. She ran for re-election in the 1945 election for the Labor-Progressive Party (the name the Communist Party would use until 1959), but came in third behind the Cooperative Commonwealth Federation and Liberal candidates with 13% of the vote.

After her defeat, she and her children moved to Toronto where she worked as an organizer for the Labor-Progressive Party and wrote a weekly column for its newspaper, Canadian Tribune, called "Women's Place is Everywhere". At times she used the column to promote feminist views; for example, as related by her biographer, Faith Johnston, in 1949 she "explained that only when a socialist economy lifted the burdens of child care and housework from the shoulders of individual women would they be able to compete with men on an equal footing.  'It is being tied to all the multitudinous tasks of home and family that robs women of the opportunity to compete with men, not her inferiority." She helped found the Congress of Canadian Women and attended the Women's International Democratic Federation Peace Congress in Budapest in 1948 and helped found the Canadian Peace Congress the next year.

In 1949, she became executive secretary of the Canadian-Soviet Friendship Association and organized national tours and local chapters, distributed films and  books, and did most of the organizational work for the  association. Frustrated by having to play second fiddle to CSFA president Dyson Carter and being paid a lower salary than him, she resigned in the summer of 1953.

She ran again for the LPP in the 1953 election, this time in Brantford, Ontario, but came in last place with 216 votes.

After politics
Finding it difficult to find work outside of the party due to her age and possibly blacklisted due to her Communist allegiance, she found a job in the mid-1950s working in the office of the United Electrical Workers but found it dull, and left Canada in 1955 for London, England with her partner, Constant Godefroy (she had been estranged from husband Pete Nielsen since 1940). They returned to Canada in 1956, and Nielsen found a job clipping articles for Maclean-Hunter Publishing.

In 1957, Nielsen and Godefroy received permission to go to the People's Republic of China, where she lived until her death, working most of that time as an English teacher and as an editor for the Foreign Languages Press in Beijing.

She became a Chinese citizen in 1962.

Family

Dorise and Peter Nielsen had four children, one of whom died in infancy. Their youngest daughter was Thelma Nielsen, known as Sally (born 1931), who in 1980 married Dyson Carter, Dorise Nielsen's former superior at the Canadian-Soviet Friendship Association.

Election results

Archives 
There is a Dorise Nielsen fonds at Library and Archives Canada. Archival reference number is R4012.

References

External links
 Faith Johnston: The Communists, the CCF and the Popular Front, Seventh Annual Robert S. Kenny Prize Lecture, May, 2007
 Dorise Nielsen 
 

1902 births
1980 deaths
Labor-Progressive Party MPs
Labor-Progressive Party candidates in the 1945 Canadian federal election
Labor-Progressive Party candidates in the 1953 Canadian federal election
Members of the House of Commons of Canada from Saskatchewan
Naturalized citizens of the People's Republic of China
Women members of the House of Commons of Canada
Women in Saskatchewan politics
British emigrants to Canada
Canadian emigrants to China
Chinese people of British descent
Canadian socialist feminists
20th-century Canadian women politicians